Elsewhere is a music venue in Bushwick, Brooklyn. It opened on October 31, 2017. It has five musical performance spaces. The venue is owned by the same individuals who owned Glasslands Gallery when it closed in 2014.

Elsewhere is in renovated warehouse near the Jefferson Street station.

In May 2020 during the COVID-19 pandemic, a replica of Elsewhere was built in Minecraft and a digital concert was held as the physical venue itself was closed due to social distancing restrictions.

References

External links
Official website

Music venues in Brooklyn
Nightclubs in Brooklyn